Picasso is a term that in the Citroën range from 1998 to 2018 referred to minivans and compact MPVs. 

Citroën bought permission to use this name through a very strict contract. 

For twenty years, there have been various vehicles bearing this name: